Isipho is a South African supernatural drama series created by Busisiwe Ntintili. It is an e.tv original production co-produced by HerbVision Multimedia and The Ntintili Factory for South African free-to-air channel e.tv and streaming service Viu.

This comes after the success of one of e.tv's recent ratings generated by local drama Imbewu: The Seed, albeit its late-night slot of 21:30. e.tv reinvested in its local content offering.

Plot 
A young Moses Shezi grew up with the gift of seeing into the future. When his gift leads to the death of his mother, he keeps silent about his gift.

Now in his old age, Moses (Nimrod Nkosi) foresees his daughter Ntombi in danger. A series of visions show him four other strangers which he sets out to find in order to change the course of destiny: a conman, a gqom artist, a weatherman and a pastor's son, each with their own special gifts and conundrums.

Cast 
Thobani Nzuza as Lwandle
Nimrod Nkosi as Moses Shezi
Saint Seseli as Pastor Rametsi 
Sparkly Xulu as Mpendulo 
Wandi Chamane as Nomzingeli
Karabo Maseko as Neo
Precious Ngidi as Ntombi Shezi
Mbalenhle Mavimbela as Tandzile. 
Themsie Times as Gogo Nqobile.
Nkanyezi as Xoli Zamisa-Zondi
Dimpho as Thandeka Nodada
Sfiso as Sipho Ndhlovu

References 

South African drama television series
2010s supernatural television series
2019 South African television series debuts
2010s drama television series